The China Center of Advanced Science and Technology (CCAST) was established on October 17, 1986, by the Chinese Academy of Sciences and the Chinese Government.

History 
The China Center of Advanced Science and Technology was established in 1986 with the support of the Chinese Academy of Sciences and the Chinese Government. It was through Professor T. D. Lee of Columbia University and the backing of the World Laboratory which the institution was founded. It was also to foster a suitable environment and to promote free exchange of scientific information between China and other countries.

References

External links 
China Center of Advanced Science and Technology Official Website

Universities and colleges in Beijing
Educational institutions established in 1986
1986 establishments in China